Johannes B. Wist (6 April 1864 –1 December 1923) was a Norwegian American newspaper editor, journalist and author.

Biography
Born Johannes Racinus Benjaminsen, he was the son of Benjamin Olaus Johansen Wist (1829–97) and Magdalena Arnoldusdatter Sliper (1836–66).  
He was born on the Sund farm in Inderøy parish in Nord-Trøndelag county, Norway. He immigrated to the United States in 1884 during his early 20s. He lived in Minnesota and Wisconsin prior to settling in Decorah, Iowa.

Wist served as editor of a number of Norwegian-language newspaper serving the immigrant Norwegian American community. He was the editor of  Fakkelen Glenwood, Minnesota 1885–1886,    Arbeitets Ridder  Minneapolis, Minnesota 1886–1887, Skandinavisk Tribune Madison, Wisconsin 1887–1888,  Nordvesten St. Paul, Minnesota 1889–1897 and Norge Granite Falls, Minnesota 1899–1900.

Most notable Wist was the editor of the Decorah-Posten  from 1901 until his death in 1923. During the period 1905 to 1914, he additionally was the founder and co-editor  of Symra, a literary magazine which was also published in Decorah, Iowa.  In 1914, he edited a survey of the Norwegian-American press entitled Norsk-amerikanernes festskrift (Decorah, Iowa: Symra Co., 1914). Wist was also the Norwegian vice-consul of the State of Iowa from 1906 to 1917.

Wist wrote a column in Decorah-Posten about a fictional Norwegian pioneer named Jonas Olsen. Originally published serially during the 1920s, the stories were subsequently published in book form. With translation by Orm Øverland, professor at the University of Bergen,  the book has been published in English as The Rise of Jonas Olsen: A Norwegian Immigrant's Saga (University of Minnesota Press; 2005)

Personal life
Wist was a Progressive Republican who held membership in the Norwegian Lutheran Synod. In 1885, Wist married Josephine Aasve (1859-1938) who was the daughter of Norwegian immigrants. They were the parents of four children: Clara, Benjamin, Annie and Joseph.

References

Other sources
 Hoerder, Dirk and Christiane Harzig  (1987) Migrants from Northern Europe. The immigrant labor press in North America, 1840s–1970s (New York: Greenwood Press) 
 Øverland, Orm  (1996) The Western Home: A Literary History of Norwegian America (Norwegian-American Historical Association)
 Øverland, Orm  (2000) Minds, American Identities: Making the United States Home, 1870–1930   (University of Illinois Press)

External links
Portrait of Johannes Wist
The Rise of Jonas Olsen. A Norwegian Immigrant’s Saga

1864 births
1923 deaths
People from Inderøy
Norwegian emigrants to the United States
Writers from Iowa
American male journalists
People from Decorah, Iowa
American magazine editors
American newspaper editors
American Lutherans